Parasram Maderna (23 July 1926 – 16 February 2014) was an Indian National Congress politician and senior Jat leader from Rajasthan, India. He came from Lakshman Nagar village in Jodhpur district. His grand daughter Divya Maderna, is presently the MLA from his constituency Osian in Jodhpur.

Membership of Legislature

1957 - 1962 - Member, Second Rajasthan Legislative Assembly
1962 - 1967 - Member, Third Rajasthan Legislative Assembly
1967 - 1972 - Member, Fourth Rajasthan Legislative Assembly
1972 - 1977 - Member, Fifth Rajasthan Legislative Assembly
1977 - 1980 - Member, Sixth Rajasthan Legislative Assembly
1980 - 1985 - Member, Seventh Rajasthan Legislative Assembly
1990 - 1992 - Member, Ninth Rajasthan Legislative Assembly
1993 - 1998 - Member, Tenth Rajasthan Legislative Assembly
1998 - 2003 - Member, Eleventh Rajasthan Legislative Assembly

Positions held

1953 - 1956 - Sarpanch, Village - Chadi, District -Jodhpur
1957 - 1962 - Member of  PAC and Estimates Committee
1987 - 1990 - Chairman, Central Cooperative Bank Ltd, Jodhpur
1962 - 1966 - Dy. Minister, Deptt of General Administration
1966 - 1977 - Minister Deptt of GAD, Revenue, Panchayat Raj, Cooperative, Forest, Colonization, Rehabilitation, Flood, Famine, Agriculture, Animal Husbandry, Community Development, Local Bodies and Sheep & Wool, Government of Rajasthan
1974 - 1977 - Dy. Leader of INC Party in the Assembly
Feb'1979 - Aug'1979, and 1993–1998,  Leader of Opposition, Rajasthan Legislative Assembly
1980 - 1981 - Chairman, Committee on Subordinate Legislation
1981 - 1982 - Minister, Deptt of Irrigation, PHED, Revenue, Land Reforms, Energy, and Flood & Famine, Government of Rajasthan
1981 - 1985 - Member, Syndicate, Jodhpur University
1982 - 1985 -  Minister, Deptt of Irrigation, PHED, and Ground Water, Govt of Rajasthan
1990 - 1992 - Chairman, Public Accounts Committee
1994 - 1998 - Chairman, Public Undertakings Committee
6 January 1999 to 15 January 2004 Speaker, Rajasthan Legislative Assembly

Party posts held
1957 - 1959 - President, District Pradesh Congress Committee
1959 - 1962 - General Secretary, Rajasthan Pradesh Congress Committee
1989 - 1994 - President, Rajasthan Pradesh Congress Committee

References

External links

Divya Maderna

Rajasthani politicians
Rajasthani people
Indian National Congress politicians
1926 births
2014 deaths
Speakers of the Rajasthan Legislative Assembly
Deaths from respiratory failure
People from Jodhpur district
Rajasthan MLAs 1972–1977
Rajasthan MLAs 1957–1962
Rajasthan MLAs 1962–1967
Rajasthan MLAs 1967–1972
Rajasthan MLAs 1977–1980
Rajasthan MLAs 1980–1985
Rajasthan MLAs 1990–1992
Rajasthan MLAs 1993–1998
Rajasthan MLAs 1998–2003
Leaders of the Opposition in Rajasthan